Sønderjyske (full name: Sønderjyske Fodbold) is a Danish association football club. The club plays in the second tier of Danish football, the Danish 1st Division. Their home is Sydbank Park in Haderslev.

Club names
Haderslev FK (14 July 1906 – 31 December 2000)
HFK Sønderjylland ("Southern Jutland", 1 January 2001 – 31 December 2003)
SønderjyskE Fodbold ("Southern Jutlandic Football", 1 January 2004 – 14 October 2022)
Sønderjyske Fodbold ("Southern Jutlandic Football", 15 October 2022 – Present)

Players

Current squad

Youth players in use 2022/23

Out on loan

Former players

  Johan Absalonsen
  Quincy Antipas
  Alexander Bah
  Tommy Bechmann
  Kenneth Fabricius
  Stefan Gartenmann
  Jacob Gregersen
  Henrik Hansen
  Pierre Kanstrup
  Niels Lodberg
  Sölvi Ottesen
  Bjørn Paulsen
  Johnny Thomsen
  Mikael Uhre

Honours
 Danish Cup
 Winners: 2019–20
 Runners-up: 2020–21

 Danish Superliga
 Runners-up: 2015–16

 Danish 1st Division
 Winners: 2004–05
 Runners-up: 2007–08

14 seasons in the Highest Danish League
8 seasons in the Second Highest Danish League
5 seasons in the Third Highest Danish League

Recent history
{|class="wikitable"
|- style="background:#efefef;"
! Season
!
! Pos.
! Pl.
! W
! D
! L
! GS
! GA
! P
!Cup
!Notes
|-
|2000–01
|SL
|align=right |12
|align=right|33||align=right|1||align=right|8||align=right|24
|align=right|30||align=right|88||align=right|11
|Fourth round
|Relegated
|-
|2001–02
|1D
|  style="text-align:right; background:#c96;"|3
|align=right|30||align=right|17||align=right|4||align=right|9
|align=right|61||align=right|50||align=right|55
|Fourth round
|
|-
|2002–03
|1D
|align=right |6
|align=right|30||align=right|13||align=right|8||align=right|9
|align=right|64||align=right|54||align=right|47
|Fourth round
|
|-
|2003–04
|1D
|align=right |6
|align=right|30||align=right|15||align=right|6||align=right|9
|align=right|72||align=right|51||align=right|51
|Third round
|
|-
|2004–05
|1D
|  style="text-align:right; background:gold;"|1
|align=right|30||align=right|19||align=right|7||align=right|4
|align=right|75||align=right|31||align=right|64
|Fifth round
|Promoted
|-
|2005–06
|SL
|align=right |11
|align=right|33||align=right|6||align=right|8||align=right|19
|align=right|41||align=right|72||align=right|26
|Fourth round
|Relegated
|-
|2006–07
|1D
|  style="text-align:right; background:#c96;"|3
|align=right|30||align=right|16||align=right|5||align=right|9
|align=right|57||align=right|34||align=right|53
|Fourth round
|
|-
|2007–08
|1D
|  style="text-align:right; background:silver;"|2
|align=right|30||align=right|17||align=right|10||align=right|3
|align=right|55||align=right|32||align=right|61
|Fourth round
|Promoted
|-
|2008–09
|SL
|align=right |10
|align=right|33||align=right|5||align=right|13||align=right|15
|align=right|30||align=right|56||align=right|28
|Third round
|
|-
|2009–10
|SL
|align=right |9
|align=right|33||align=right|11||align=right|8||align=right|14
|align=right|37||align=right|43||align=right|41
|Quarter-finals
|
|-
|2010–11
|SL
|align=right |7
|align=right|33||align=right|11||align=right|6||align=right|16
|align=right|32||align=right|46||align=right|39
|Second round
|
|-
|2011–12
|SL
|align=right |6
|align=right|33||align=right|11||align=right|11||align=right|11
|align=right|48||align=right|51||align=right|44
|Semi-finals
|
|-
|2012–13
|SL
|align=right |8
|align=right|33||align=right|12||align=right|5||align=right|16
|align=right|53||align=right|57||align=right|41
|Fourth round
|
|-
|2013–14
|SL
|align=right |10
|align=right|33||align=right|10||align=right|8||align=right|15
|align=right|41||align=right|53||align=right|38
|Third round
|
|-
|2014–15
|SL
|align=right |10
|align=right|33||align=right|7||align=right|16||align=right|10
|align=right|35||align=right|44||align=right|37
|Semi-finals
|
|-
|2015–16
|SL
|  style="text-align:right; background:silver;"|2
|align=right|33||align=right|19||align=right|5||align=right|9
|align=right|56||align=right|36||align=right|62
|Quarter-finals
|
|-
|2016–17
|SL
|align=right |6
|align=right|36||align=right|12||align=right|10||align=right|14
|align=right|44||align=right|54||align=right|46
||Fourth round
|
|-
|2017–18
|SL
|align=right |8
|align=right|32||align=right|11||align=right|8||align=right|13
|align=right|42||align=right|40||align=right|41
||Quarter-finals
|
|-
|2018–19
|SL
|align=right |10
|align=right|32||align=right|9||align=right|8||align=right|15
|align=right|37||align=right|45||align=right|35
||Fourth round
|
|-
|2019–20
|SL
|align=right |10
|align=right|32||align=right|9||align=right|11||align=right|12
|align=right|37||align=right|49||align=right|38
|style="text-align:left; background:gold;"|Winners
|
|-
|2020–21
|SL
|align=right |8
|align=right|32||align=right|13||align=right|5||align=right|14
|align=right|45||align=right|48||align=right|44
|style="text-align:left; background:silver;"|Runners-up
|
|-
|2021–22
|SL
|align=right |12
|align=right|32||align=right|4||align=right|11||align=right|17
|align=right|28||align=right|54||align=right|23
|Semi-finals
|Relegated
|-
|}

Sønderjyske in Europe

Managers
 Poul Hansen (1989–96)
 Knud Nørregaard (1996)
 Frank Andersen (1997–03)
 Søren Kusk (1 January 2004 – 26 August 2005)
 Morten Bruun (2005–06)
 Ole Schwennesen (2006–07)
 Carsten Broe (24 April 2007 – 30 June 2009)
 Michael Hemmingsen (1 July 2009 – 17 September 2009)
 Frank Andersen (18 September 2009 – 31 December 2009)
 Michael Hemmingsen (1 January 2010 – 30 June 2011)
 Lars Søndergaard (1 July 2011 – 30 June 2015)
 Jakob Michelsen (1 July 2015 – 31 December 2016)
 Claus Nørgaard (5 January 2017 – 17 December 2018)
 Glen Riddersholm (1 February 2019 – 26 May 2021)
 Michael Boris (19 June 2021 – 1 November 2021)
 Henrik Hansen  (16 December 2021 – 5 November 2022)
 Thomas Nørgaard  (15 December 2022 – Present)

References

External links
 Official site
 Official supporters site: SønderjyskE Fodbold Support

 
Football clubs in Denmark
2004 establishments in Denmark